In molecular biology, the adaptor complexes medium subunit domain is a protein domain found at the C-terminus of the mu subunit from various clathrin adaptor protein complexes (AP1, AP2, AP3, AP4 and AP5) and muniscins. The C-terminal domain has an immunoglobulin-like beta-sandwich fold consisting of 9 strands in 2 sheets with a Greek key topology, similar to that found in cytochrome f and certain transcription factors. The mu subunit regulates the coupling of clathrin lattices with particular membrane proteins by self-phosphorylation via a mechanism that is still unclear. The mu subunit possesses a highly conserved N-terminal domain of around 230 amino acids, which may be the region of interaction with other AP proteins; a linker region of between 10 and 42 amino acids; and a less well-conserved C-terminal domain of around 190 amino acids, which may be the site of specific interaction with the protein being transported in the vesicle.

References

External links
 

Protein families